Robert "Bob" Schiller is a Canadian retired ice hockey defenseman who won back-to-back National Championships for Michigan in the 1950s.

Career
Schiller was one of many Ontario-natives to be recruited by Vic Heyliger and helped to continue Michigan's 10-year run as an NCAA superpower. When he made the varsity team as a sophomore, Schiller helped the Wolverines establish themselves as one of the top defensive teams in the country and reach the NCAA tournament. Schiller was one of three Wolverines to earn AHCA Second Team All-American honors that year. In the tournament Schiller earned only a single assist but his defensive work earned him a spot on the All-Tournament Second Team.

In his junior season the Michigan defense was nearly impenetrable and Schiller was again named an All-American. In their march towards a sixth championship Michigan needed all the defensive work they could summon in the semifinal. Despite a furious effort, St. Lawrence was held to a single goal in their overtime win. The Wolverine offense showed up in the final, scoring 7 goals against Michigan Tech, including one from Schiller, and the team captured its second consecutive title. In his senior season Michigan again reached the championship game, however, the team could not restrain the dominating offense from Colorado College and lost 6–13, the highest-scoring championship game in history (as of 2020).

After graduating with a degree in Aeronautical and Aerospace Engineering, Schiller played two seasons for the Toledo Mercurys while earning his MBA.

Statistics

Regular season and playoffs

Awards and honors

References

External links

1933 births
Living people
Canadian ice hockey defencemen
Ice hockey people from Ontario
Sportspeople from Windsor, Ontario
Toronto St. Michael's Majors players
Michigan Wolverines men's ice hockey players
Toledo Mercurys players
NCAA men's ice hockey national champions
AHCA Division I men's ice hockey All-Americans